"Talula" is a song by American singer-songwriter Tori Amos, released as the second single from her third studio album, Boys for Pele (1996). It reached number 22 on the UK Singles Chart and appeared in the Jan de Bont film Twister.

The single version, titled "The Tornado Mix", is remixed by BT, who went on to work with Amos on "Blue Skies", and includes a minor dance beat. In the UK, "Talula (The Tornado Mix)" replaced the original version of the song on the album and eventual re-pressings in the US and Australia. BT also remixed an extended mix called the "Synesthasia Mix" which appeared on copies of the single.

Meaning

The song is about the concept of ideal woman and the fear of losing someone. The lyrics includes references to queens like Marie Antoinette and Anne Boleyn.

The B-side "Sister Named Desire" is a reference to Delirium's sister/brother Desire of Sandman, created by Amos' friend Neil Gaiman. The character of Delirium is frequently inspired by Tori, although Delirium was created before Gaiman met her. "Desire" was later remastered for the compilation Where's Neil When You Need Him?, which featured tracks inspired by Gaiman's work.  This is not the first nor last time Tori has mentioned Neil Gaiman; he is referenced in her songs: "Tear in Your Hand", "Space Dog", "Horses", "Hotel", "Carbon", and "Not Dying Today".

Critical reception
Larry Flick from Billboard wrote, "Typically beady and tough to penetrate on a lyrical level, this is a roller coaster of musical sounds, rapidly swerving from sweeping acoustic strumming to electro-hip funk beats."

Track listings

 US maxi-CD single
 "Talula" (Tornado album version) – 3:43
 "Samurai" – 3:03
 "Frog on My Toe" – 3:40
 "London Girls" (Chas & Dave cover) – 3:20
 "Talula" (BT's Synethasia mix) – 11:27

 UK CD1 and Australian CD single
 "Talula" (the Tornado mix) – 3:43
 "Talula" (BT's Synethasia mix) – 11:27
 "Amazing Grace / Til' the Chicken" – 6:48

 UK CD2
 "Talula" (the Tornado mix) – 3:43
 "Frog on My Toe" – 3:40
 "Sister Named Desire" – 5:29
 "Alamo" – 5:11

 UK cassette single
 "Talula" (the Tornado mix) – 3:43
 "Sister Named Desire" – 5:29

Personnel
Personnel are lifted from the Boys for Pele album booklet.

 Tori Amos – writing, vocals, harpsichord, production
 George Porter Jr. – bass
 Manu Katche – drums
 Mino Cinelu – percussion
 Steve Caton – mandolins, all guitars
 Alan Friedman – drum programming
 Tracy Griffin – flugelhorn
 Brian Graber – flugelhorn
 Clarence J. Johnson III – tenor saxophone
 Mark Mullins – trombone, horn arrangement

 Craig Klein – sousaphone
 Mark Hawley – recording
 Marcel van Limbeek – recording
 Rob van Tuin – recording assistant
 Bob Clearmountain – mixing
 Ryan Freeland – mixing assistant
 Brian Transeau – Tornado mix reworking
 Tim Weidner – Tornado mix engineering and Sound Tools
 Bob Ludwig – mastering

Charts

References

Tori Amos songs
1996 singles
1996 songs
Atlantic Records singles
East West Records singles
Music videos directed by Mike Lipscombe